is a Japanese CG animation television series produced by Toei Animation. The series first aired in April 2017 and ended in June 2017. The series follows master negotiator Kōjirō Shindō, working for the Ministry of Foreign Affairs, as he chooses to represent Yaha-kui zaShunina, an otherworldly entity with the main intention to advance the world by progressively introducing four mysterious devices to humanity. The episode zero, which tells the event before Kōjirō and Shun taking off on the plane, was exclusively distributed via Amazon Prime Video in Japan and Crunchyroll.

Plot
On a plane bound for their business trip, Kōjirō Shindō and his co-worker Shun Hanamori witness the sudden appearance of the Kado, a cube of two kilometers length, out of thin air landing and enveloping their plane. All 252 passengers including Kōjirō, Shun, and the flight crew members are admitted intact into the cube and they encounter a strange being within. This being assumes the form of a human man, identifying himself as Yaha-kui zaShunina, and he wishes to "advance the world".

Characters

Main Characters

A highly skilled negotiator working for the Ministry of Foreign Affairs. He is the only person involuntarily induced with a sense of the anisotropic because he was the first person to exit the Kado when at that time, information about humanity had not been fully processed by the Kado. After meeting Yaha-kui zaShunina, he resigned from his current position and became the negotiator for the anisotropic. He treats Yaha-kui as a normal human and is open to the devices Yaha-kui has introduced to humanity but is later convinced otherwise by Saraka.

A being from a separate Spacetime known as the "anisotropic" whose intention is to accelerate the evolution of humanity. He chose to enter Japan due to the strong feeling of the Japanese that they are superior to other countries. He progressively introduces four devices to humanity: Kado (a cube with powerful computing capabilities), Wam (a pair of spheres containing infinite energy), Sansa (a cross-sectioned brain which induces a sense of the anisotropic when looked at), and Nanomis-hein (a fragmented sphere which can alter gravity, inertia and mass). While not posing a threat initially, Yaha-kui later reveals his true forceful nature in achieving his goals.

The International Negotiator for the Ministry acting on behalf of the Japanese government delegation. Whilst not against the anisotropic itself, she disapproves of the devices Yaha-kui zaShunina introduces as they impact "humanity's dignity" and urged Kōjirō to reassess Yaha-kui's purpose. She is later revealed to be an anisotropic being herself and the administrator of the universe humanity resides within.

Government of Japan

Kōjirō's co-worker. He became the negotiator from the Japanese government to the anisotropic after Kōjirō passed up the offer and gave it to him.

Prime Minister of Japan.

Assistant Secretary for National Public Safety Commission. He went to the same university as Kōjirō.

Cabinet Secretariat of National Security Agency information team. She went to the same university as Kōjirō and Shūhei. She is in love with Shūhei, but realizes that she "is not capable enough to handle him" so she steps back.

Science Council of Japan

A genius researcher and lead scientist tasked to study the anisotropic. She is one of few people that is capable of creating her own Wam, due to her childlike mind.

Others

A reporter from NNK who becomes interested with the anisotropic. After the video he reported on got billions of views, he got recruited by the CEO of SETTEN, Adam Ward.

The CEO of the world's largest internet services, SETTEN who takes interest in Kado and personally hires Takumi to report directly inside the Kado.

Kōjirō and Saraka's 16-year-old daughter. By using Nanomis-hein, Kōjirō and Saraka shifted the relative time up to 16 years later, and Shun raised Yukika during that time. She is said to be "Kōjirō and Saraka's trump card" to go against Yaha-kui because she was born from a human and an anisotropic being.

Media

Anime
In their presentation at Second Quarter 2016's financial result, Toei Animation confirmed that they are producing an original anime project titled Seikai Suru Kado. The official website for the anime went online at the end of August. Mado Nozaki wrote the series, with Kazuya Murata directing the anime, and illustrator Ako Arisaka doing the original character designs. Kōichi Noguchi produced the series. The anime aired from April to June 2017, on Tokyo MX, MBS, BS Fuji, and AT-X with online streaming via Amazon Prime Video M.A.O performed the opening theme  under her character name Saraka Tsukai, and HARUCA for the ending theme titled . Takaya Kamikawa narrates the story at the beginning of each episode. Crunchyroll holds the right for online streaming. Funimation has licensed the series in North America.

Manga
A manga adaptation was launched on March 22, 2017 in Kodansha's Morning Two magazine. Mutsumi Okuhashi illustrates the manga while Mado Nozaki has been credited for the original work.

A spin-off manga titled  was launched on North Star Pictures' Web Comic Zenyon website on April 29, 2017. Kōki Ochiai draws the manga. The story takes place after episode 5 and follows a group of high school students whose lives are radically changed with the arrival of Kado and the infinite energy source, Wam.

Notes

References

External links
Official website 

2017 anime television series debuts
Anime with original screenplays
Funimation
Seinen manga
Toei Animation television
Japanese computer-animated television series
Tokyo MX original programming